George Hughes may refer to:

George Hughes (American football) (1925–2009), former NFL player
George Hughes (cricketer) (1821–1872), English cricketer and the basis for the literary character Tom Brown
George Hughes (priest) (1603–1667), English Puritan priest and writer
George Hughes (engineer) (1865–1945), British locomotive engineer
George Hughes (ice hockey) (born 1988), American professional ice hockey defenceman
George Hughes (rugby) (1870–1947), rugby union footballer of the 1890s for England, and Barrow
George Hughes (1889–1930), African American lynched in Sherman, Texas
George E. Hughes (1853–1937), merchant and political figure in Prince Edward Island, Canada
George Edward Hughes (1918–1994), professor of philosophy at the Victoria University of Wellington
George O. Hughes (born 1962), Ghanaian-born American artist
George Wurtz Hughes (1806–1870), U.S. Congressman from Maryland
Pat Hughes (tennis) (George Patrick Hughes, 1902–1997), English tennis player
 George Hughes (printer), see George Howe (printer)